Facundo Bagnis and Sergio Galdós were the defending champions but chose not to defend their title.

Nathaniel Lammons and Jackson Withrow won the title after defeating Alexander Erler and Lucas Miedler 7–5, 5–7, [11–9] in the final.

Seeds

Draw

References

External links
 Main draw

Salzburg Open - Doubles